Abdul Majid Kabar (Arabic: عبد المجيد كعبار / ʿbd āl-Mağid Kaʿbār ) (9 May 1909 – 4 October 1988), also known as Abdulmegid Coobar, was the Prime Minister of Libya from 26 May 1957 to 17 October 1960, and he is from a Circassian origin.

Biography 
Kubar worked his way up in Tripolitanian politics until he was appointed a member of the National Constituent Assembly in 1950. In Libya first general election 1952, he entered parliament and served as the house speaker until he became prime minister in 1957. A financial scandal centered on the cost of a road being built in Fezzan to Sabha led to his downfall. Originally cost $5.3 million and scheduled to be completed in three years, the cost overruns led to later estimates of three times the cost. Fearing a vote of no confidence, he resigned in 1960.

References 

Prime Ministers of Libya
1909 births
Foreign ministers of Libya
1988 deaths
Transport ministers of Libya